"Jingle Bell Rock" is an American Christmas song first released by Bobby Helms in 1957. It has received frequent airplay in the United States during every Christmas season since then, and is generally considered Helms' signature song. "Jingle Bell Rock" was composed by Joseph Carleton Beal (1900–1967) and James Ross Boothe (1917–1976), although both Helms and session guitarist on the song Hank Garland disputed this (see Authorship controversy section below). Beal was a Massachusetts-born public relations professional and longtime resident of South Ocean Avenue in Atlantic City, New Jersey, and Boothe was an American writer in the advertising business.

Helms recordings
"Jingle Bell Rock" has been performed by many, but Helms' first version from 1957 produced by Paul Cohen is the best known. The song's title and some of its lyrics are an extension of the old Christmas standard, "Jingle Bells". It makes brief references to other popular songs of the 1950s, such as "Rock Around the Clock", and mentions going to a "Jingle hop". An electric guitar played by Hank Garland can be heard playing the first notes of the chorus of "Jingle Bells". Backup singers were the Anita Kerr Singers.

Helms' original version, on Decca 9-30513 from October 1957, was re-recorded by him on Kapp K-719 in 1965, and yet again in 1967 on Little Darlin' LD-0038. In 1970, Helms recorded an entire album titled Jingle Bell Rock on Certron C-7013, releasing the title track on Certron C-10021, with a picture sleeve. He again recorded the song for Gusto Records, it was subsequently released on their "Power Pak" label. In yet another re-recording, Helms released a version on Ashley AS-4200 (year unknown). In 1983, Helms released his last recording of "Jingle Bell Rock" on Black Rose 82713.

D-TV set this version to the Disney shorts, Once Upon a Wintertime from Melody Time and On Ice.

Personnel
Bobby Helms – vocals, guitar
Hank Garland – guitar
Anita Kerr Singers – backup vocals

Lee recording
Brenda Lee recorded the song on June 23, 1964, for her album Merry Christmas from Brenda Lee on the Decca label. It was released on October 19, 1964. The album reached No. 7 on the Billboard charts with the song Rockin' Around the Christmas Tree reaching No. 2 on Billboard Hot 100 in 2020. Lee's recording of Jingle Bell Rock has charted every year on the Billboard Top 100 since 2019.

Cover versions
Lindsay Lohan covered the song in 2022 for her Netflix film Falling for Christmas as a nod to her performance of the track in 2004's teen comedy Mean Girls.

Authorship controversy
Helms, as well as session guitarist on the song Hank Garland, both claimed until their deaths, that it was they, not Beal and Boothe, who wrote the song. They claimed that the original song by Beal and Boothe was called Jingle Bell Hop, and that it was given to Helms by a Decca executive to record. This song, according to Helms and Garland, had little to no resemblance to the current song. Helms did not like it, and as a result, they both proceeded to work on it, changing the music, lyrics, and tempo and also giving it a previously missing bridge. This new song, they claimed, was the one that is known today. However, neither of them received writing credit or subsequent writing royalties.

Billy Garland, brother of Hank Garland, maintains his deceased brother's story, and has long been involved with and vocal about the issue.

Chart and sales performance
The original version of Helms charted at No. 13 on Billboards Most Played C&W by Jockeys chart, a predecessor to the Hot Country Songs chart. It also crossed to the pop charts, peaking at No. 6 on the Billboard Best Sellers in Stores chart, and at No. 11 on Cashbox magazine's Top 60 on the week ending January 11, 1958.

After the song was featured on the soundtrack album to the 1996 film Jingle All the Way, the original Bobby Helms version returned to the Billboard country singles charts in late 1996 and early 1997, reaching a peak of No. 60.

The Helms version entered the Billboard Hot 100 chart on the week ending January 9, 2016, which was the song's first entry on the chart since its last appearance on the week ending December 29, 1962. On the week ending January 7, 2017, "Jingle Bell Rock" hit at number 29. In January 2019, the song entered the Hot 100's top 10 for the first time reaching No. 8. With this feat, Helms broke the record for the longest wait to the Hot 100's top 10 as he achieved this in 60 years, four months and two weeks after his first entry back in 1958. Helms' recording reached a new peak of No. 3 on the chart dated January 4, 2020.

According to Nielsen SoundScan, the digital track of Helms' original Decca recording was ninth on the list of all-time best-selling Christmas/holiday digital singles in SoundScan history in 2016 with 780,000 downloads. As of December 2019, it has sold 891,000 copies in the United States. Recently, the track was performed by artists like Brenda Lee and Ariana Grande.

Bobby Helms

Weekly charts

Year-end charts

Brenda Lee

George Strait

Aaron Tippin

Rascal Flatts

Blake Shelton and Miranda Lambert

Various artists version

Hall & Oates version
Hall & Oates and their band released a version in 1983 as a non-album single which peaked at number 30 on the Hot 100 Recurrents chart in 2005; it also reached number 6 on the Billboard's Holiday Airplay chart on December 13, 2008, and number 24 on the Hot Holiday Songs chart on December 10, 2011. There are two video versions: one with Daryl Hall and another with John Oates singing lead. Both versions feature G. E. Smith as a grandma, playing the guitar with gloves.

Weekly charts

Max Bygraves UK version
Max Bygraves released a version in 1959 with the Eric Rogers Orchestra which peaked at number 7 in the UK Top 30, released on Decca: F11176

Chubby Checker & Bobby Rydell version
Chubby Checker & Bobby Rydell recorded and released a version in 1961 which reached No. 21 on the Billboard Hot 100 singles chart, No. 3 in Canada, and No. 40 on the UK Singles Chart. It was issued on Cameo Parkway C205.

Certifications

Bobby Helms version

Hall & Oates version

References

External links
 

Songs about rock music
1957 songs
1964 songs
1967 songs
Bobby Helms songs
Bill Haley songs
Brenda Lee songs
Aaron Tippin songs
Bobby Rydell songs
George Strait songs
Hall & Oates songs
American Christmas songs
Decca Records singles